-

The Central Amalgamated Workers' Union (CAWU) is a trade union in New Zealand. It is one of three autonomous unions, with the Northern Amalgamated Workers' Union, and the Southern Amalgamated Workers' Union, who operate nationally as the Amalgamated Workers' Union (AWUNZ).

External links
 AWUNZ official site.

New Zealand Council of Trade Unions
Trade unions in New Zealand